Prince Ikpe Ekong (born 5 October 1978) is a Nigerian former professional footballer who played as a midfielder. He is best remembered for representing Reggiana, Shenyang Ginde, Xiamen Lanshi, GAIS, and Djurgårdens IF during his career. A full international between 2001 and 2004, he won nine caps for the Nigeria national team.

Career 

After the 1994 World Cup a series of Nigerian players was brought to the European top leagues, and Ikpe Ekong was signed by Italian club Reggiana, then coached by Carlo Ancelotti.

Reggiana 

Due to Italian rules regarding non-EU players, he could not play for the first team in Serie A, he ended up going on a loan to FC Koper from Slovenia, when he returned to Italy he was loaned out again to Tecos UAG of Mexico, then AC Bellinzona from Switzerland and FCM UTA from Romania. It would not be until 2000 when Prince Ikpe Ekong returned to Italy to play for A.C. Reggiana. However Reggiana had fallen to Serie C2 where no non-EU players were allowed, and this led to Ikpe Ekong filing a lawsuit against the Italian FA, which he won, allowing him to play in Serie C2.

Allsvenskan 

In 2003, he moved to China and Changsha Ginde and later Xiamen Lanshi. In 2006 four clubs where interested in signing him, French club CS Sedan, Maccabi Tel Aviv from Israel, Gençlerbirliğ from Turkey and GAIS from Sweden. He chose GAIS after he visited the club and then visited a local church where he heard God tell him to sign for GAIS. In 2008, he left GAIS to sign for Allsvenskan rivals Djurgårdens IF. He was bought out of his contract with Djurgården in November 2011 after having played none of the games in the 2011 season. In 2016, Prince played for Märsta IK in the fifth tier of the Swedish Football League system.

Personal life 
Ekong is the father of professional footballer Emmanuel Ekong.

Honours
Xiamen Lanshi
China League One: 2005

References

External links 

 
 World Soccer profile

Living people
1978 births
Sportspeople from Lagos
Nigerian footballers
Nigeria international footballers
Nigerian expatriate footballers
Association football midfielders
Bridge F.C. players
FC Koper players
Expatriate footballers in Slovenia
Tecos F.C. footballers
Expatriate footballers in Mexico
AC Bellinzona players
Expatriate footballers in Switzerland
FC UTA Arad players
Liga I players
Expatriate footballers in Romania
A.C. Reggiana 1919 players
Expatriate footballers in Italy
Changsha Ginde players
Xiamen Blue Lions players
Chinese Super League players
China League One players
Expatriate footballers in China
GAIS players
Djurgårdens IF Fotboll players
Allsvenskan players
Expatriate footballers in Sweden
Nigerian expatriate sportspeople in Slovenia
Nigerian expatriate sportspeople in Sweden
Nigerian expatriate sportspeople in China
Nigerian expatriate sportspeople in Romania
Nigerian expatriate sportspeople in Switzerland
Nigerian expatriate sportspeople in Italy
2004 African Cup of Nations players
Slovenian PrvaLiga players